Stage and birth name , married name , is a Japanese actress and singer.

External links

JMDb Profile 
at Phoenix 

1975 births
Living people
Japanese actresses
Japanese women singers